Graeme Geoffrey White (born 18 April 1987) is a professional cricketer currently playing for Northamptonshire.

Career
Graeme was educated at Stowe School in Buckinghamshire, which is also where former Northamptonshire teammates Rob White, Ben Howgego and Mark Nelson studied. Earlier on in his career, he scored 109 and took 7 for 21 for Staffordshire U17s during 2003. Graeme then progressed on to playing second XI cricket for Northamptonshire  at the end of the 2004 season and throughout the 2005 season. He played for England in the 2006 U-19 Cricket World Cup in Sri Lanka.

In 2009 Graeme moved to Nottinghamshire citing the need for regular first team cricket as the main motivation. He made little impact at Notts and briefly returned to Northants on loan in June 2013, and later that year signed a longer term contract with the club.

Graeme's highest first-class innings came on 10 August 2007, when he scored 65, sharing in a 145-run partnership with David Sales. His best first-class bowling figures are 6/44, playing for Northants against Glamorgan at Northampton in September 2016.

References

External links

Northants Cricket Page

1987 births
English cricketers
Living people
Northamptonshire cricketers
People educated at Stowe School
Nottinghamshire cricketers
North v South cricketers
People from Milton Keynes
English cricketers of the 21st century
Welsh Fire cricketers
Cricketers from Buckinghamshire